Daphne Rubin-Vega ( Vega; born November 18, 1969) is a Panamanian-American actress, dancer, and singer-songwriter. She is best known for originating the roles of Mimi Marquez in the Broadway musical Rent and Lucy in the Off-Broadway play Jack Goes Boating.

Rubin-Vega also appeared as Bombshell publicist Agnes in the second season of the TV series Smash (2012) and as Luisa Lopez in the TV series Katy Keene (2020). In 2021, Rubin-Vega starred as salon owner Daniela in the film adaptation of Lin-Manuel Miranda's In the Heights.

Early life
Rubin-Vega was born in Panama City, Panama, the daughter of Daphine Corina, a nurse, and José Mercedes Vega, a carpenter. Her stepfather Leonard Rubin was a writer. Her mother's family came to Panama from Barbados, as the canal created opportunities for West Indians of African descent throughout the Caribbean. Her
mother moved from Panama to the United States with her children when Daphne was only two years old, and passed away eight years later.

Rubin-Vega studied theater at the New LAByrinth Theater Company as well as with William Esper Studio. She also performed with the comedy group El Barrio USA.

Career

Rent and Broadway
While performing with El Barrio USA, Rubin-Vega landed an audition for a new musical written and composed by Jonathan Larson. The role was for Broadway musical Rent, and the role was Mimi Marquez, a nineteen-year-old, HIV-positive heroin addict who works at the Cat Scratch Club as an exotic dancer. Before landing the role, Rubin-Vega claims that she was not a major fan of musical-theater. The struggling actress auditioned for musical director Tim Weil by singing "Roxanne" by The Police. She was then handed an original number from the production and told to learn it. 

Rubin-Vega performed in the original workshop before the play went to Broadway. At the time, the script was vastly different from the current version. She developed the role all the way to its Broadway premiere on April 29, 1996. She left the cast on April 5, 1997, and was replaced by Marcy Harriell. Rubin-Vega did not participate in the film adaptation of Rent, as she was pregnant at the time of the movie's casting and filming. The role subsequently went to Rosario Dawson. One of her castmates was Wilson Jermaine Heredia, with whom she also starred in the 1999 film Flawless.

Rubin-Vega has two Tony Award nominations to her credit: one for her role in Rent as Best Actress in a Musical, and the other for her performance as Conchita in Anna in the Tropics (2003), as Best Performance by a Featured Actress in a Play. She won the Theatre World Award in 1996 for Rent. She was also awarded the Blockbuster Award for Best Supporting Actress in a Suspense Thriller for her role in the film Wild Things.
She later appeared in the 2000 Broadway production of The Rocky Horror Show in the role of Magenta. She continued the role through the 2001 terrorist attacks in New York, and in 2005, Rubin-Vega later recounted in an interview with Fox News that the theater had gone from selling out to barely selling any tickets at all: "It went from full house to practically two people." 

She starred with Phylicia Rashad in a musical version of Federico García Lorca's The House of Bernarda Alba at Lincoln Center in March 2006. She played the role of Fantine in the 2006 Broadway revival of the popular musical Les Misérables beginning November 9. On March 2, 2007, she was replaced by Lea Salonga.

Later career: Jack Goes Boating and further productions
In February 2007, Daphne Rubin-Vega performed alongside Philip Seymour Hoffman in the play Jack Goes Boating off-Broadway at The Public Theater and also appeared in the film version. Rubin-Vega appeared in a cameo role in Sex and the City, which premiered in May 2008.

In November 2010, she received the Independent Spirit Awards nomination for 2011, for her role in Jack Goes Boating. The award ceremony was held in Santa Monica, California in February 2011. She starred Off-Broadway as Yvette in Tommy Nohilly's world premier of Blood From A Stone at The New Group's Acorn Theater until February 19, 2011. She appeared in the Off-Broadway cast of Love, Loss, and What I Wore from March 23 to April 24, 2011. Later that year, the feature film Union Square, co-written and directed by the Sundance Film Festival's Grand Jury Award Winner, Nancy Savoca, premiered at the Toronto International Film Festival. In spring 2012, Rubin-Vega returned to Broadway in a new revival of Tennessee Williams' A Streetcar Named Desire, playing the role of Stella Kowalski opposite Blair Underwood as Stanley. This revival was directed by Emily Mann and featured a mostly African-American cast.

In October 2016, Rubin-Vega starred in the world premiere of Miss You Like Hell, a new musical by Quiara Alegría Hudes and Erin McKeown, at the La Jolla Playhouse. The show opened off-Broadway at The Public Theater in New York on April 10, 2018, with Rubin-Vega reprising the role of Beatriz.

Rubin-Vega performed the lead role in the scripted fiction podcast, The Horror of Dolores Roach, which was released by Gimlet Media in October 2018. The story, co-starring Bobby Cannavale as Louis, is a contemporary reimagining of Sweeney Todd, using cannibalism as a metaphor for gentrification. Dolores Roach is an adaptation of Rubin-Vega's stage performance in the one-woman play Empanada Loca. Both Empanada Loca and Dolores Roach were written by playwright Aaron Mark especially for Rubin-Vega, who said in a Vulture interview that he "wanted to do a deep dive into a character we haven't seen depicted much in the horror cannon."

Since 2020, she has played the role of Luisa Lopez, a recurring character, in the television series Katy Keene on The CW. In 2021, she played the role of Daniela in In the Heights, earning praise for her performance from critics. Her involvement with the original musical dates back to its Off-Broadway and Broadway productions, where she provided the voice of the DJ who opens the show.

Music career
She began her musical career as the lead singer for the Latin freestyle group Pajama Party, placing three songs on the Billboard Hot 100 in 1989 and 1990. As a solo artist her biggest success is on the Hot Dance Music/Club Play chart, where in 1996 she hit No. 1 with the song "I Found It."

She returned to the top of the dance/club play charts in 2003 with a dance version of Elton John's "Rocketman". In 2001, she recorded her debut full-length rock album of original songs, Souvenirs. The album was never officially released after Mercury Records was purchased by Seagram. After being dropped from her label, Rubin-Vega began gifting copies out to fans, encouraging them to leak it online. The record later saw limited release for the charity Broadway Cares.

Rubin-Vega also released her second full-length album of original songs titled Redemption Songs released in October 2006 on Sh-K Boom Records. Her rock band DRV regularly performs live shows in New York City.

Personal life 
Rubin-Vega has been married to businessman Thomas Costanzo since 2002. They have a son.

Discography
With Pajama Party:
 1989 – Up All Night
 1991 – Can't Live Without It

Solo-work:
 1994 – When You Love Someone (Single)
 1995 – Change (Single)
 1995 – I Found It (Single) Produced and co-written by David Anthony
 2001 – Souvenirs
 2003 – Rocket Man (EP)
 2006 – Redemption Songs

Rubin-Vega also appears on the original cast recording of Rent and the revival recording of The Rocky Horror Show. Rubin-Vega also appears on A Very Marti Holiday, a Christmas album heavily featured on Shade: Queens of NYC in which Rubin-Vega also had a guest appearance, and on the Katy Keene soundtrack.

Awards and nominations

References

External links

 Official site
 
 
 
 Broadway.com Q&A: Daphne Rubin-Vega
 Time Out New York Interview: Daphne Rubin-Vega
 Luna Art the Magazine: Daphne Rubin-Vega Interview

1969 births
Panamanian emigrants to the United States
American dance musicians
Living people
Hispanic and Latino American actresses
People from Panama City
Theatre World Award winners
Hispanic and Latino American women singers
21st-century American women